Nataliya Mechislavovna Volchek (born 6 January 1972, in Minsk) is a Belarusian rower.

References 
 
 

1972 births
Living people
Belarusian female rowers
Sportspeople from Minsk
Rowers at the 1996 Summer Olympics
Olympic bronze medalists for Belarus
Olympic rowers of Belarus
Olympic medalists in rowing
Medalists at the 1996 Summer Olympics